The blackish grass mouse (Thaptomys nigrita) also formerly called the ebony akodont, is a rodent species from South America. It is found in Argentina, Brazil, Paraguay and Uruguay.  It is the only species in the genus Thaptomys.

References

Akodontini
Rodents of South America
Mammals of Argentina
Mammals of Brazil
Mammals of Paraguay
Mammals of Uruguay
Mammals described in 1830